"Soul Destruction" is a song by British band T'Pau, released as the third single from their 1991 third studio album The Promise. The song was written by vocalist Carol Decker and rhythm guitarist Ron Rogers. It was produced by Andy Richards.

Background
The single was released as the follow-up single to "Walk on Air", which had entered the Top 75 in the UK. "Soul Destruction" continued the group's decline and failed to enter the UK Singles Chart, the first T'Pau single not to do so since their second 1987 single "Intimate Strangers". It would be the band's final UK single release before splitting up, although Decker would later revive the T'Pau name and release the 1998 album Red. The song peaked at No. 46 on the Music Week Playlist Chart in October 1991.

In the Risk Collective of 24 March 2009, Decker was interviewed, and she mentioned the song, stating "I really like some of our less well known tracks e.g. "Soul Destruction" and "Man and Woman" from "The Promise" album."

Release
The single was issued on 7" and 12" vinyl, as well as CD and cassette, via Siren Records, whilst it was marketed/distributed by Virgin Records. It was released in the UK only.

The single release was not the same as the album version from The Promise. Instead it was a remix (simply labelled "Soul Destruction (Remix)"). This remix, along with additional production, was handled by Phil Harding and Ian Curnow. Both men were part of the successful Pete Waterman Entertainment production team.

The 7" vinyl release featured the B-side "Dirty Town", which had previously appeared on the 12" vinyl and CD version of the previous single "Walk on Air". The song was written and produced by all members of T'Pau.

The 12" vinyl release was limited edition and was released as a "Special Edition Gatefold Sleeve with Exclusive T'Pau Tour Poster". This poster was a 30x20 inch "The Promise Tour 1991" glossy poster. The release featured an extended eight-minute version of the "Soul Destruction (Remix)" track, along with the album version of the song, and the B-side "Dirty Town".

For the CD release of "Soul Destruction", the design used for the release was a special foldout digipak poster sleeve. On the single, the normal version of the "Soul Destruction (Remix)" track was included alongside "Soul Destruction (Heavy Bliss Mix)", which was an exclusive instrumental remix, and "Whenever You Need Me (Requiem Remix)", which was another exclusive over six-minute remix of the leading hit single from The Promise album. "Dirty Town" was the fourth and final track on the release.

The cassette version came with a cardboard slip case, and featured the same tracks as on the 7" vinyl; "Soul Destruction (Remix)" and "Dirty Town".

All four releases featured the same artwork of an opening of colour amongst a black background. Although a photograph of the band was not displayed on the front cover, there was one of T'Pau on the backside. The limited edition 12" vinyl release used this photograph on the front cover instead. This photograph of the group was credited to Mike Owen.

Following the song's release on The Promise album and as a single, the song also appeared on the UK four-track album promo "Whenever You Need Me - Sampler" release, along with the three other singles from the album "Whenever You Need Me", "Walk on Air" and "Only a Heartbeat". It also appeared on the Japanese promotional only Virgin 10-track CD compilation This is... Nothin' But T'Pau, which was housed in a unique Carol Decker picture sleeve with extensive photo and info booklet.

Promotion
A music video was created to promote the single.

T'Pau also appeared on the UK Saturday morning children show Gimme 5 and mimed the song, along with "Whenever You Need Me".

On "The Promise" album tour, the song would often be part of the set-list and on YouTube, a live version of the band performing the song at Cardiff on 4 October 1991 exists. This version would open with a piano and vocal section not heard in the studio recording and would include introductions of the band members.

Track listing
7" Single
"Soul Destruction (Remix)" - 3:39
"Dirty Town" - 3:59

12" Single
"Soul Destruction (Remix)" - 8:02
"Soul Destruction (Album Version)" - 3:44
"Dirty Town" - 3:59

CD Single
"Soul Destruction (Remix)" - 3:39
"Soul Destruction (Heavy Bliss Mix)" - 3:52
"Whenever You Need Me (Requiem Remix)" - 6:22
"Dirty Town" - 3:59

Cassette Single
"Soul Destruction (Remix)" - 3:39
"Dirty Town" - 3:59

Critical reception
Alex Henderson of AllMusic spoke of the song in a review of The Promise album, where he stated "Indeed, commercial, radio-minded songs like "Made of Money," "Only a Heartbeat" and "Soul Destruction" begged the question: if American listeners could accept Roxette, why not T'Pau? The Promise isn't remarkable, but it isn't a bad listen either."

Personnel
 Carol Decker – lead vocals
 Dean Howard – lead guitar
 Ronnie Rogers – rhythm guitar
 Michael Chetwood – keyboards
 Paul Jackson – bass guitar
 Tim Burgess – drums

Additional personnel
 Producer of "Soul Destruction" – Andy Richards
 Mixing on "Soul Destruction (Album Version)" – Chris Lord-Alge
 Mastering on "Soul Destruction" – Bob Ludwig
 Remix, additional production on "Soul Destruction (Remix)" – Phil Harding, Ian Curnow
 Producer on "Dirty Town" – T'Pau
 Mixing on "Dirty Town" – Chris Lord-Alge
 Photography – Mike Owen
 Sleeve design – Mark Millington/The Graphic Edge

References

External links

1991 singles
T'Pau (band) songs
Songs written by Carol Decker
Songs written by Ron Rogers